Malisa Longo (born 13 July 1950) is an Italian actress, model and writer.

Life and career 
Born Maria Luisa Longo in Venice, at young age Longo moved to Rome where she started a career as a model; she entered the Miss Italia beauty contest, winning the Miss Cinema and the Miss Lazio titles. After having appeared in a number of commercials, Longo made her acting debut in 1968, in the Antonio Margheriti's giallo film The Young, the Evil, and the Savage. She then appeared in a number of films, sometimes in main roles, and was especially active in the Nazisploitation and commedia sexy all'italiana genres.  

She is perhaps most famous worldwide for her cameo early in Bruce Lee's film Way of the Dragon.

Malisa was directed three times by the great master of Italian erotica, Tinto Brass, in films such as Salon Kitty (1976) and Miranda (1985), in which she opposite Serena Grandi.

Longo retired from acting in 1997. In 2000 she debuted as a writer with the novel Così come sono, and her works include poetries (Il cantico del corpo) and essays (Aggiungi un seggio a tavola).

Longo was married to film producer Riccardo Billi and resides in Chicago, Illinois.

Selected filmography

 The Young, the Evil, and the Savage (1968) aka Naked... You Die
 A Girl Called Jules (1970) 
 More Dollars for the MacGregors (1970)
 La banda de los tres crisantemos (1970)
 Blindman (1971) 
 Way of the Dragon (1972)
 The Ribald Decameron (1972)
 The Sicilian Connection (1972)
 Naughty Nun (1972)
 Ricco the Mean Machine (1973) 
 War Goddess (1973) aka The Bare Breasted Warriors
 Il domestico (1974)
 Super Stooges vs. the Wonder Women (1974)
 Black Emanuelle (1975)
 White Fang and the Hunter (1975)
 L'adolescente (1976)
 Salon Kitty (1976)
 Mark Strikes Again (1976)
 Emmanuelle bianca e nera (1976)
 Fraulein Kitty (1977)
 California (1977)
 Helga, She Wolf of Stilberg (1977)
 El Macho (1977)
 War of the Robots (1978) aka Reactor
 Star Odyssey (1979)
 The Iron Hand of the Mafia (1980)
 La dottoressa ci sta col colonnello (1980)
 Gunan, King of the Barbarians (1982) aka Gunan the Warrior, The Invincible Barbarian
 The Red Monks) (1989)
 A Cat in the Brain (1990) aka Nightmare Concert

References

External links 
 
 

Italian film actresses
Italian television actresses
Italian stage actresses
20th-century Italian actresses
1950 births
Models from Rome
Living people
Actresses from Rome